Francisco Ávila Camberos (born 13 December 1948) is a Mexican politician who is candidate of the PAN (Partido Acción Nacional), and became friends with Jorge González Olivieri, the director of API (Administración Portuaria Integral de Veracruz), and the former president of Mexico, Vicente Fox. A graduate of the Universidad Veracruzana, he was a federal deputy in the LIX Legislature of the Mexican Congress.

See also 
 Veracruz state election, 1997

References 

Living people
1948 births
National Action Party (Mexico) politicians
Municipal presidents in Veracruz
Universidad Veracruzana alumni
Academic staff of Universidad Veracruzana
20th-century Mexican politicians
21st-century Mexican politicians
Politicians from Veracruz
People from Veracruz (city)
Deputies of the LIX Legislature of Mexico
Members of the Chamber of Deputies (Mexico) for Hidalgo (state)

es:Francisco Ávila Camberos